Svenska Cupen 2002 was the forty-seventh season of the main Swedish football Cup. The competition started on 1 April 2002 and concluded on 9 November 2002 with the Final, held at Råsunda Stadium, Solna Municipality in Stockholms län. Djurgårdens IF won the final 1–0 against AIK.

First round
There were 34 matches played between 1 April and 16 April 2002. There were 68 teams in the first round from Division 1, Division 2 and Division 3, but also including a few teams from Division 4 and Division 5.

!colspan="3"|1 April 2002

|-
!colspan="3"|10 April 2002

|-
!colspan="3"|13 April 2002

|-
!colspan="3"|14 April 2002

|}

Second round
In this round the 34 winning teams from the previous round were joined by 30 teams from Allsvenskan and Superettan.  The 32 matches were played between 23 April and 4 May 2002.

!colspan="3"|23 April 2002

|-
!colspan="3"|24 April 2002

|-
!colspan="3"|25 April 2002

|-
!colspan="3"|4 May 2002

|}

Third round
The 16 matches in this round were played between 7 May and 17 May 2002.

!colspan="3"|7 May 2002

|-
!colspan="3"|8 May 2002

|-
!colspan="3"|9 May 2002

|-
!colspan="3"|16 May 2002

|-
!colspan="3"|17 May 2002

|}

Fourth round
The 8 matches in this round were played between 26 June and 27 June 2002.

!colspan="3"|26 June 2002

|-
!colspan="3"|27 June 2002

|}

Quarter-finals
The 4 matches in this round were played between 18 July and 26 July 2002.

!colspan="3"|18 July 2002

|-
!colspan="3"|19 July 2002

|-
!colspan="3"|26 July 2002

|}

Semi-finals
The semi-finals were played on 26 September 2002.

!colspan="3"|26 September 2002

|}

Final

The final was played on 9 November 2002 at the Råsunda Stadium.

Footnotes

External links 
 Svenska Cupen 2002 - Svenskfotboll.se - Official Website
  Svenska Cupen 2002 – everysport.com
  Sweden Cup 2002 - rsssf.com

2002
Cupen
2002 domestic association football cups